Wheelchair curling is an adaptation of curling for athletes with a disability affecting their lower limbs or gait. Wheelchair curling is governed by the World Curling Federation, and is one of the sports in the Winter Paralympic Games.

Overview
Wheelchair curling is played with the same rocks and on the same ice as regular curling, though the rocks are thrown from a stationary wheelchair and there is no sweeping. Rocks may be thrown by hand while leaning over the side of the wheelchair, or pushed by a delivery stick. This is a pole with a bracket that fits over the rock handle, allowing the rock to be pushed while applying correct rotation.

Stones delivered between the house and the near hogline must be placed within 18 inches either side of the centre line and must be released prior to reaching the near hogline.

National and international competitions are played under rules devised by the World Curling Federation. These rules mandate that teams be of mixed gender, and that games be eight ends in duration. Time limits of 38 minutes of thinking time for each team with one 60 second time out will be enforced by time clocks. Eligibility is limited to people with disabilities such that a wheelchair is used for daily mobility – more specifically, those who are non-ambulant or can walk only very short distances.

At their April 2010 semi-annual meeting, the World Curling Federation lifted their ban on the use of power chairs at WCF sanctioned events.

Wheelchair curling can be played by people with a wide range of disabilities. All that is needed is the co-ordination to exert a measured pushing force, and a tolerance for cold. It is not an aerobic activity. Without the need for sweepers, wheelchair curling is well suited to two-person formats such as stick-curling.

Wheelchair curling began in Europe in the late 1990s and in North America in 2002. The first World Wheelchair Curling Championship was held in Sursee, Switzerland in 2002, and was won by the host nation who beat Canada 7–6 in the final. It started as a Paralympic sport at the 2006 Winter Paralympics in Turin, Italy. Canada, skipped by Chris Daw, won the gold medal, beating Great Britain, skipped by Frank Duffy, 7–4 in the final.

The 2009 World Championship was held in Vancouver, British Columbia, Canada in the same venue used for the 2010 Olympic and Paralympic Winter Games. Team Canada, skipped by 6-time Brier competitor Jim Armstrong, finished the round robin in 4th place but defeated USA 9–2 in the Page playoff, Germany 10–4 in the semi-final and Sweden 9–2 in the final to win their first ever Worlds gold medal.

Canada repeated as Paralympic Champions in Vancouver 2010 when the all-British Columbia team of Sonja Gaudet, Ina Forrest, Darryl Neighbour and skip Jim Armstrong, after taking an early 8–1 lead, defeated South Korea 8-7 for the gold medal. Sweden, who had their 3rd Glenn Ikonen disqualified for failing a drug test, beat USA 7–5 to win bronze.

World championship

2002:  (Urs Bucher)
2004:  (Frank Duffy)
2005:  (Frank Duffy)
2007:  (Rune Lorentsen)
2008:  (Rune Lorentsen)
2009:  (Jim Armstrong)
2011:  (Jim Armstrong)
2012:  (Andrey Smirnov)
2013:  (Jim Armstrong)
2015:  (Andrey Smirnov)
2016:  (Andrey Smirnov)
2017:  (Rune Lorentsen)
2019:  (Wang Haitao)
2020:  (Konstantin Kurokhtin)
2021:  (Wang Haitao)

Winter Paralympic Games

2006:  (Chris Daw)
2010:  (Jim Armstrong)
2014:  (Jim Armstrong)
2018:  (Wang Haitao)
2022:  (Wang Haitao)

References

External links

World Curling Federation
Wheelchair Curling on International Paralympic Committee website
Wheelchair curling resources

 
Variations of curling
Curling
Curling